Lim Chang-yong (born June 4, 1976) is a former South Korean professional baseball right-handed pitcher. He pitched in Major League Baseball, Nippon Professional Baseball, and KBO League baseball. In the In the KBO, Lim ranks among the top ten pitchers in terms of career wins, strikeouts, and saves.

Career
Lim is a 5 ft 11 in, 175 lb right-handed sidearm pitcher. He could throw a  four-seam fastball, though the pitch usually sat at 93–95 mph (150–153 km/h). His signature pitch was his two-seam fastball which, due to its unique tailing movement earned the nickname "Serpent fastball". His other pitches included a high 70s slider with a sharp horizontal break, a mid 80s forkball, and a rarely used  slow-curveball. He was one of the few pitchers who could pitch in multiple pitching forms. Lim pitched primarily sidearm and underhand, but could pitch from the three-quarters motion at will.

KBO (1995–2007)

Haitai Tigers
Lim made his pro debut in 1995 with the Haitai Tigers in Korea Baseball Organization, and was regularly picked for the South Korean baseball team as a relief pitcher since the 1998 Asian Games, and won the bronze medal at the 2000 Summer Olympics and two Asian Game gold medals in 1998 and 2002.

Samsung Lions
Though predominantly known as a closer, Lim was converted to a starting pitcher in 2001, and spent three years as the Samsung Lions' starter before returning to the bullpen in 2004. There was interest from Major League squads, but Lim decided to stay in South Korea.

NPB (2008–2012)

Tokyo Yakult Swallows
In late 2007, Lim was signed by Japan's Tokyo Yakult Swallows in the hopes of bolstering their weak bullpen. In the 2008 NPB season, he recorded 33 saves (5th in the NPB league) with a 3.00 ERA in 51 innings pitched.

In the 2009 NPB season, he recorded a 0.00 ERA for a few months, earning his nickname "Mr.Zero", and was also featured in the 2009 NPB All-star Game as a closer for the Central League team. He was sent down to the reserve squad after his ERA rose to 1.84 in a short stint, but he was brought back to strengthen Yakult's weak bullpen, which was responsible for its recent losses.

Lim had his second Tommy John surgery in July 2012.

MLB (2013)

Chicago Cubs
After the 2012 season, Lim agreed to a contract with the Chicago Cubs of Major League Baseball. The Cubs promoted Lim to the major leagues on September 4, 2013. After the season, Lim was non-tendered by Chicago, becoming a free agent. The Cubs re-signed him to a minor league contract. He was released on March 24, 2014.

KBO (2014–2018)

Second stint with Lions
After being released by the Cubs, Lim signed up with Samsung Lions of KBO League (South Korea). In 2014 season, he recorded 31 saves with 5.84 ERA. However, in 2015 season he showed better performance of 33 saves, 2.83 ERA. 

Lim was released after 2015 season for illegal gambling.

Second stint with Tigers 
Lim played with the Tigers for the second time in 2016–2018. On March 11, 2019, he announced his retirement.

See also 
 List of KBO career win leaders
 List of KBO career strikeout leaders
 List of KBO career saves leaders

References

External links

Career statistics and player information from Korea Baseball Organization
Lim Chang-yong at Kia Tigers Baseball Club 

Chang-Yong Lim  at databaseOlympics

Lim Chang-yong Fancafe at Daum 

1976 births
Living people
Asian Games gold medalists for South Korea
Asian Games medalists in baseball
Arizona League Cubs players
Baseball players at the 1998 Asian Games
Baseball players at the 2000 Summer Olympics
Baseball players at the 2002 Asian Games
Baseball players at the 2014 Asian Games
Chicago Cubs players
Daytona Cubs players
Haitai Tigers players
Iowa Cubs players
KBO League pitchers
Kia Tigers players
Major League Baseball pitchers
Major League Baseball players from South Korea
Medalists at the 1998 Asian Games
Medalists at the 2000 Summer Olympics
Medalists at the 2002 Asian Games
Medalists at the 2014 Asian Games
Nippon Professional Baseball pitchers
Olympic baseball players of South Korea
Olympic bronze medalists for South Korea
Olympic medalists in baseball
Samsung Lions players
South Korean expatriate baseball players in Japan
South Korean expatriate baseball players in the United States
Sportspeople from Gwangju
Tokyo Yakult Swallows players
Tennessee Smokies players
2009 World Baseball Classic players
2017 World Baseball Classic players